William Allen Booth (November 7, 1949 – December 31, 2006) was an American child actor, best known for his role as Dennis Mitchell's best friend Tommy Anderson on the CBS sitcom Dennis the Menace, based on the Hank Ketcham comic strip of the same name. He made guest appearances on The Twilight Zone, My Three Sons, The Donna Reed Show, Lawman, The Many Loves of Dobie Gillis, and The Andy Griffith Show.  He also provided the voice for Wentworth in the 1962 Merrie Melodies episode Honey's Money.

Booth graduated from Crescenta Valley High School in 1967, from the University of Southern California in 1971, and from the University of California, Hastings College of the Law in 1974. He became a practicing lawyer and moved to Los Osos, California in 1977. He taught business and real estate law at both Cuesta College and Cal Poly San Luis Obispo, both located in San Luis Obispo County, California. He divorced his wife Kathern.  He practiced law in Morro Bay, California.

Booth died on December 31, 2006 of liver complications at the age of 57.

Filmography

Film

Television

References

Further reading
 Dye, David. Child and Youth Actors: Filmography of Their Entire Careers, 1914-1985. Jefferson, NC: McFarland & Co., 1988, p. 24.

External links

1949 births
2006 deaths
American male film actors
American male child actors
American male television actors
20th-century American lawyers
Male actors from Los Angeles
20th-century American male actors
Deaths from liver disease
People from San Luis Obispo, California
People from Morro Bay, California